Clint Joseph Sammons (born May 15, 1983) is an American former Major League Baseball catcher who played for the Atlanta Braves from 2007 to 2009.

Amateur career
A native of Lilburn, Georgia, Sammons attended Parkview High School, and was selected by the Los Angeles Dodgers in the 43rd round of the 2001 MLB Draft. He did not sign with them however, and instead played college baseball at the University of Georgia, where he was starting catcher. In 2003, he played collegiate summer baseball with the Cotuit Kettleers of the Cape Cod Baseball League and was named a league all-star. He was selected by the Braves in the 6th round of the 2004 MLB Draft and eventually signed with the Braves.

Professional career
Sammons began his professional career with the Braves Rookie team, the Danville Braves. The Braves organization named Sammons as the Rome Braves Player of the Year. In 121 games with the Rome Braves, he batted .286 with 4 home runs. In , he spent the entire season with the Single-A Myrtle Beach Pelicans.

In , he began the season with the Myrtle Beach Pelicans again. After 23 games with the Pelicans, he was promoted to the Double-A Mississippi Braves. He went on the finish the minor league season at Mississippi. On September 11, 2007, the Braves added him to the major league roster as the fourth catcher when they purchased his contract. The next day, he made his major league debut as a defensive replacement. He got his first two Major League hits on September 30, the last day of the season, which included a double. He hit his first Major League home run on July 31, 2008. Sammons became a free agent at the end of the 2009 season. He signed a one-year minor league contract with the Braves for the 2010 season, then signed two one year, minor league deals with the Miami Marlins for the 2011–2012 seasons.

References

External links

1983 births
Living people
Baseball players from Atlanta
Major League Baseball catchers
Georgia Bulldogs baseball players
Cotuit Kettleers players
Danville Braves players
Rome Braves players
Myrtle Beach Pelicans players
Mississippi Braves players
Richmond Braves players
Gwinnett Braves players
Gulf Coast Marlins players
New Orleans Zephyrs players
Atlanta Braves players
Peoria Javelinas players